Juliette Lewis is an American actress who came to prominence in the early 1990s after appearing in numerous independent and mainstream films. After appearing in National Lampoon's Christmas Vacation (1989), she garnered widespread fame for her performance in Martin Scorsese's Cape Fear (1991), which earned her Academy Award and Golden Globe Award nominations for Best Supporting Actress.

She followed this with a supporting role in Woody Allen's Husbands and Wives (1992), the thriller Kalifornia, and drama What's Eating Gilbert Grape (the latter two both released in 1993). She gained further notice for her role as murderous woman Mallory Knox in Oliver Stone's controversial satirical crime film Natural Born Killers (1994). Lewis subsequently starred in Kathryn Bigelow's science fiction film Strange Days (1995), playing a musician, and appeared as a teenager in Robert Rodriguez's vampire film From Dusk till Dawn (1996). In 1999, Lewis had a leading role as a mentally-disabled woman in the drama The Other Sister.

The 2000s saw Lewis appearing in a series of supporting roles in independent features as well as studio films, and in 2003 she earned an Emmy nomination for Outstanding Supporting Actress for her role in the television film Hysterical Blindness (2002). She went on to appear in supporting parts in such comedies as Todd Phillips's Old School (2003) and Starsky & Hutch (2004). Subsequent film roles include the sports comedy Whip It (2009), the biographical crime film Conviction (2010), and the drama August: Osage County (2013). In the later 2010s, Lewis worked more frequently in television, appearing in lead roles on the series  The Firm (2012), Wayward Pines (2015), Secrets and Lies (2015–2016), and The Act (2019).

Film

Television

Music videos

Video games

See also
List of awards and nominations received by Juliette Lewis

References

Actress filmographies
American filmographies